Transfiguration Cathedral or Cathedral of the Transfiguration may refer to:

Canada
 Cathedral of the Transfiguration (Markham), Markham, Ontario, Canada

Lithuania
 Transfiguration Cathedral, Kaišiadorys

Romania
 Transfiguration Cathedral, Cluj-Napoca, Romania

Russia
 Transfiguration Cathedral (Saint Petersburg)
 Transfiguration Cathedral (Tolyatti)
 Transfiguration Cathedral, Khabarovsk
 Transfiguration Cathedral, Novosibirsk
 Transfiguration Cathedral (Tambov)
 Transfiguration Cathedral, Pereslavl-Zalessky, a building of pre-Mongol Rus
 Transfiguration Cathedral, Rybinsk, one of the tallest church buildings in the world
 Transfiguration Cathedral (Yaroslavl), the katholikon of the Spaso-Preobrazhensky Monastery in Yaroslavl

Spain
 Huesca Cathedral or the Holy Cathedral of the Transfiguration of the Lord, a Roman Catholic cathedral in Huesca, Spain

Ukraine
 Transfiguration Cathedral, Chernihiv, a building of pre-Mongol Rus
 Transfiguration Cathedral, Dnipropetrovsk
 Transfiguration Cathedral, Odessa
 Transfiguration Cathedral, Vinnytsia

United States
 Russian Orthodox Cathedral of the Transfiguration of Our Lord in New York City
 Cathedral Shrine of the Transfiguration, the cathedral of the Episcopal Diocese of Virginia, U.S.